Anmyeondo (Korean: Hangul 안면도, Hanja 安眠島) is an island in Taean county, South Chungcheong Province, South Korea. Originally a peninsula, Yeonguijeong Kim Yuk ordered the flooding of the area between Changgiri (Anmyeoneup) and Sinonri (Nammyeon) to protect tax sent to Hanyang (now Seoul) from plunder by Japanese pirates. In 1970, the Anmyeongyo bridge (length 208.5 metres) was constructed to connect the island to the mainland.

Places to travel 
Gijipo beach
Ggotji beach
Duegi beach
Duyeo beach
Baramarae beach
Batgae beach
Bangpo beach
Baeksajang beach
Sambong beach
Saetbyeol beach
Anmyeon beach
Janggok beach
Jangsampo beach

References

Islands of the Yellow Sea
Taean County
Islands of South Chungcheong Province